Edward A. Bullen (1884 – 11 August 1917) was an English professional football left half who made over 180 Football League appearances for Bury and captained the club.

Personal life 
Bullen was born in Warrington and grew up in Altrincham. While he was footballer with Bury, he ran a pub in Warrington. In August 1916, two years after the outbreak of the First World War, Bullen enlisted as a gunner in the Royal Field Artillery. He was killed at Vaulx-Vraucourt, France on 11 August 1917 and was buried in Vraucourt Copse Cemetery. At the time of his death, Bullen's wife was pregnant with their first child.

Career statistics

References

External links 

 Teddy Bullen at buryfc.co.uk

1884 births
1917 deaths
Footballers from Warrington
English footballers
English Football League players
Association football midfielders
British Army personnel of World War I
Royal Field Artillery soldiers
British military personnel killed in World War I
Altrincham F.C. players
Bury F.C. players
Military personnel from Cheshire